This is a list of the most common surnames in Asia, in alphabetical order of the country.

Armenia
Source: Armenia's Voter List

Azerbaijan

Bangladesh

Cambodia

China

According to a report released by the Ministry of Public Security in January 2019, there are 6,150 different surnames in China with the top 100 surnames used by 85% of the population in 2018.

Georgia

India

Indonesia

Most Indonesians do not use a family last name. There is only a small number of ethnic groups which maintain family names.

Israel

Japan

The most common Japanese surnames are Satō (佐藤), Suzuki (鈴木), Takahashi (高橋), Tanaka (田中), and Watanabe (渡辺).

Korea

Nepal
Surnames in Nepal are divided into three origins; Indo-Aryan languages, Tibeto-Burman languages and indigenous origins. Indo-Aryan surnames dominate over Tibeto-Burman Languages and Indigenous Origins surnames.

1. Rai - Common Surnames of Nepalese/Himalayan Indigenous Nations/Natives.
2. Rai Clans/Septs (Confederation) - 
Bantawa,
Chamling,
Kulung,
Mewahang,
Bahing,
Lohorung,
Puma,
Dumi,
Dungmali,
Nachhiring,
Lingkhim/Lungkhim,
Chhiling/Chhulung,
Mugali/Lambichong,
Athpahariya,
Thulung,
Khaling,
Mewahang,
Bayung,
Yamphu,
Tilung,
Sampang,
Wambule,
Dewas,
Jerung/Jero,
Waling and Phangduwali.
3. Chamling La-Chamling Language-Rodung as Rai
5. Meaning of Rai - King

Philippines

The Catálogo alfabético de apellidos (English: Alphabetical Catalogue of Surnames; Tagalog: Alpabetikong Katalogo ng mga apelyedo) is a book of surnames in the Philippines and other islands of Spanish East Indies published in the mid-19th century. This was in response to a Spanish colonial decree establishing the distribution of Spanish family names and local surnames among colonial subjects who did not have a prior surname. It is also the reason why Filipinos share the same surnames of Spanish people.

The book was created after Spanish Governor-General Narciso Clavería y Zaldúa issued a decree on 21 November 1849, to address the lack of a standard naming convention. Newly-Christianized Filipinos often chose the now-ubiquitous surnames of de los Santos, de la Cruz, del Rosario, and Bautista for religious reasons; others preferred names of well-known local rulers such as Lacandola. To complicate matters further, discrepancies like family members holding different surnames would hinder some of the colonial government's activities such as taking a census and tax collection.

 De la Cruz 
 Santos 
 Reyes 
 Cruz 
 Bautista
 Del Rosario 
 Gonzales 
 Ramos 
 Aquino 
 Garcia 
 Lopez
 Fernández 
 Mendoza 
 Morales 
 Marquez
 Hernandez 
 Navarro 
 Sanchez 
 De los Reyes 
 De los Santos

Russia 

 See also: Список общерусских фамилий (in Russian Wikipedia)

The 20 most common widespread Russian surnames (for males) from the European part of Russia, as calculated by Balanovskaya et al. (2005):

Those Russian surnames that end with -ov/-ev or -in/-yn are originally patronymic or metronymic possessive adjectivals with the meaning 'son of' or 'daughter/wife of' (the feminine is formed with the -a ending – Smirnova, Ivanova, etc.). In older documents such surnames were written with the word syn 'son', for example, Ivánov syn 'John's son' or Il'yín syn 'Elijah's son'; the last word was later dropped. Such names are roughly equivalent to the English or Welsh surnames Richardson or Richards.

The Russian equivalent of 'Smith', 'Jones', and 'Brown' (that is, the generic most often used surnames) are Ivanov, Petrov, Sidorov, or 'Johns', 'Peters', and 'Isidores', although Sidorov is now ranked only 66th.

Sri Lanka

Many low country Sinhalese have Portuguese surnames as a result of Portuguese colonial rule in that area during the 16th and 17th centuries. Sinhalese native surnames have a Sanskrit origin. Tamils and Sri Lankan Moors have distinctive surnames for their own ethnicities.

Many Sinhalese surnames end with Singhe (Sinhalese: සිංහයා meaning lion), such as Jayasinghe, Ranasinghe, Samarasinghe.

Taiwan

According to a comprehensive survey of residential permits released by the Taiwanese Ministry of the Interior's Department of Population in 2016, Taiwan has only 1,503 surnames. The top ten surnames in Taiwan accounted for 52.77% of the general population, and the top 100 accounted for 96.56%.

Thailand

There are no common Thai surnames. Surnames were largely introduced to Thai culture only by the 1913 Surname Act. The law does not allow one to create any surname that is duplicated with any existing surnames. Under Thai law, only one family can create any given surname: any two people of the same surname must be related, and it is very rare for two people to share the same full name. In one sample of 45,665 names, 81% of family names were unique.

Turkey

Vietnam

Due to historical contact with Chinese dynasties, Vietnamese has adopted names originating from Middle Chinese. Vietnam is in the East Asian cultural sphere.

See also 

 List of family name affixes
 List of most popular given names
 Lists of East Asian surnames
 Lists of most common surnames, for other continents

Notes

References

Asia
Surnames, most common